The 1991 Kansas Jayhawks football team represented the University of Kansas as a member of the Big Eight Conference during the 1991 NCAA Division I-A football season. Led by fourth-year head coach Glen Mason, the Jayhawks compiled an overall record of 6–5 with a mark of 3–4 in conference play, placing fifth in the Big 8. The team played home games at Memorial Stadium in Lawrence, Kansas. Kansas finished with a winning record for the first time since 1981.

Schedule

Personnel

Season summary

Missouri
Tony Sands rushed for NCAA record 396 yards.

References

Kansas
Kansas Jayhawks football seasons
Kansas Jayhawks football